Paola Bonfante is a Professor Emerita of plant biology at the University of Turin, she has studied symbiosis between fungi and plants (mycorrhizae), associations that involve 90% of plants with significant impacts on ecosystems, as well as on agriculture.

Awards and honors 
 2019: Appointed Commander (“Commendatore”) of the “Order of Merit of the Italian Republic” by the President of the Italian Republic (“motu proprio”)
 2010: Award for the Award for the French Food Spirit- Science – Paris, December 16, 2010 2021: The Adam Kondorosi -Academia Europaea Award for Advanced research, September 2021

She is in the list of:
 Clarivate Analytics: highly quoted researcher 2017, 2018, 2020
 One hundred Italian Experts

References

External links
Prof. Paola Bonfante - Emeritus Professor - University of Turin - Italy

1947 births
Living people
University of Turin alumni
20th-century Italian botanists
Women botanists
20th-century Italian women scientists
Scientists from Turin
21st-century Italian botanists
21st-century Italian women scientists
Members of Academia Europaea